Teladoma is a genus of moth in the family Cosmopterigidae.

Species
Teladoma astigmatica (Meyrick, 1928)
Teladoma exigua Hodges, 1978
Teladoma habra Hodges, 1978
Teladoma helianthi Busck, 1932
Teladoma incana Hodges, 1962
Teladoma murina Hodges, 1962
Teladoma nebula Hodges, 1978
Teladoma tonia Hodges, 1978

References
Natural History Museum Lepidoptera genus database

Cosmopteriginae